Fossan is a village in the municipality of Selbu in Trøndelag county, Norway. Fossan is located about halfway between the villages of Selbustrand and Tømra.

References

Villages in Trøndelag
Selbu